Maximilian "Max" Raub (13 April 1926 – 17 November 2019) was an Austrian sprint canoer who competed in the 1950s. Competing in two Summer Olympics, he won two bronze medals in the K-2 1000 m event (1952, 1956). Raub also won four medals at the ICF Canoe Sprint World Championships with a gold (K-2 10000 m: 1954) and three bronzes (K-1 4 x 500 m: 1950, 1954; K-2 500 m: 1950).

References

Maximilian Raub's obituary

External links
 

1926 births
2019 deaths
Austrian male canoeists
Canoeists at the 1952 Summer Olympics
Canoeists at the 1956 Summer Olympics
Olympic canoeists of Austria
Olympic bronze medalists for Austria
Olympic medalists in canoeing
ICF Canoe Sprint World Championships medalists in kayak
Medalists at the 1956 Summer Olympics
Medalists at the 1952 Summer Olympics